Minnesota State Highway 81 was a state highway in the U.S. state of Minnesota. It ran north from what is now TH 200 to Crookston. It was eliminated when US 75 was realigned to this road in the mid-1950s.

Route description
Highway 81 served as a north-south route between Halstad, Shelly, Nielsville, Climax, Eldred, and Crookston.

Legally, the highway was defined as Legislative Route 175 in the Minnesota Statutes § 161.115(106).

History
State Highway 81 was authorized in 1934.

The number was removed in the mid-1950s when U.S. Route 75 was realigned to this road.

Major intersections

References

081 1934
Crookston, Minnesota
U.S. Route 75